Minutes to Midnight is the fourth studio album by Australian musician, Jon English. The album was released in Australia in March 1977. 
Three singles were released from the album, including "Lay it All Down" which peaked at number 46 on the Kent Music chart.

Track listing
Vinyl/ Cassette (2907 031)
Side one
 "Lay it all Down"	(Barry Goldberg, Will Jennings) - 3:35
 "Hey Moonshine" - 3:28	
 "Don't Let Me Be Misunderstood" (Gloria Caldwell, Sol Marcus, Bennie Benjamin) - 3:16	
 "Whole Lot More" - 3:38
 "A Long Way to Go" (Barry Mann, Cynthia Weil) - 3:29
 "Behind Blue Eyes" (Pete Townshend) - 4:55

Side two	
 "Everytime I Sing a Love Song"	- 4:01
 "Break Another Dawn" - 3:01
 "Lady L" - 3:05
 "Midnight Suite"  (made up of "Crossword", "Minutes To Midnight" and "Comfortable")  - 9:16

Weekly charts

References

External links

1977 albums
Jon English albums
Polydor Records albums